Colebrook is a town in Litchfield County, Connecticut, United States. The population was 1,361 at the 2020 census. Colebrook was named after Colebrooke in the English county of Devon; the reason is now unknown.

Geography
Colebrook is in northeastern Litchfield County and is bounded to the east by Hartford County, Connecticut, and to the north by Berkshire and Hampden County in Massachusetts. Colebrook River Lake and West Branch Reservoir, both on the West Branch of the Farmington River, are in the northeast part of the town. Algonquin State Forest is in the central part of the town.

Principal communities
Colebrook center
North Colebrook
Robertsville

Demographics

As of the census of 2000, there were 1,471 people, 566 households, and 419 families residing in the town. There were 656 housing units at an average density of 20.8 per square mile (8.0/km2). The racial makeup of the town was 97.01% White, 0.68% African American, 0.61% Asian, 0.88% from other races, and 0.82% from two or more races. Hispanic or Latino of any race were 2.45% of the population.

There were 566 households, out of which 32.2% had children under the age of 18 living with them, 65.2% were married couples living together, 5.1% had a female householder with no husband present, and 25.8% were non-families. 19.6% of all households were made up of individuals, and 7.1% had someone living alone who was 65 years of age or older.  The average household size was 2.60 and the average family size was 3.01.

In the town, the population was spread out, with 24.5% under the age of 18, 4.2% from 18 to 24, 29.6% from 25 to 44, 27.5% from 45 to 64, and 14.1% who were 65 years of age or older.  The median age was 41 years. For every 100 females, there were 102.1 males.  For every 100 females age 18 and over, there were 101.5 males.

The median income for a household in the town was $58,684, and the median income for a family was $64,286. Males had a median income of $42,647 versus $35,987 for females. The per capita income for the town was $29,789. About 1.4% of families and 2.6% of the population were below the poverty line, including none of those under age 18 and 9.0% of those age 65 or over.

Transportation
The town is served by Connecticut Routes 8, 182, and 183. Route 8 leads south  to Winsted and north  to New Boston, Massachusetts. Route 182 leads west  to U.S. Route 44 in Norfolk, while Route 183 leads south  to Winsted and northwest  to New Marlborough, Massachusetts.

Education

It is in the zone for Northwestern Regional School District No. 7: Northwestern Regional Middle School and Northwestern Regional High School.

Notable locations
Rock Hall, a building designed by architect Addison Mizner, listed on the National Register of Historic Places.

Wind farm siting
Wind Colebrook was a proposal to build the state's first utility scale wind turbine project, for which permitting was ultimately denied.

BNE Energy was cleared to build three wind turbines in Colebrook and two 2.85MW, 100m-diameter turbines were installed in 2015. A third (3.8MW, 130m rotor diameter) turbine is planned for installation by 2021. According to BNE Energy's quarterly generation reports to PURA, the Colebrook wind farm has slightly exceeded the planned level of energy generation, with 12,742MWh generated in 2016 and 12,706MWh generated in 2017. The wind farm, according to these figures, is operating at about 30 percent of its rated capacity.

Notable people

 Rufus Babcock, second president of Colby College; born in North Colebrook
 Donald Barr (1921–2004), novelist, educator, and book reviewer for The New York Times; retired to Colebrook in the 1980s
 Abiram Chamberlain (1837–1911), the 60th governor of Connecticut; born in Colebrook
 Jonathan Edwards (the younger) (1745–1801), theologian; lived and preached in Colebrook for four years
 Eric Foner (born 1943), Columbia University professor, author, and noted Civil War historian; part-time resident of the town
 Harris Merton Lyon, short story writer; lived in North Colebrook
 Christine Negroni (1956- ), noted aviation and travel writer; part-time resident of the town
 James Phelps (1822–1900), judge, Connecticut state legislator and US congressman; born in Colebrook
 Lancelot Phelps (1784–1866), congressman and father to James Phelps
 Ammi Phillips (1788–1865), artist; born in Colebrook
 Thomas Robbins (1777–1856), Congregational minister, bibliophile, and antiquarian; died in Colebrook
 Julius Rockwell (1805–1888), judge and congressman from Massachusetts; born in Colebrook

References

External links

Official website

 
Towns in Litchfield County, Connecticut
Towns in the New York metropolitan area
Towns in Connecticut